Grigory Borisovich Shneyderman (born 7 July 1953 in Tula, USSR) is a Russian Paralympic judoka.

In 2000, he won the silver medal in the men's -100 kg event. In 2004, he competed in the same event.

References

Paralympic judoka of Russia
Judoka at the 2000 Summer Paralympics
Judoka at the 2004 Summer Paralympics
Paralympic silver medalists for Russia
Living people
1953 births
Russian male judoka
Sportspeople from Tula, Russia
Medalists at the 2000 Summer Paralympics
Paralympic medalists in judo
20th-century Russian people
21st-century Russian people